Daniel Anderson (born December 19, 1964) is an American poet and educator.

Biography
Anderson, an Ohio native, holds degrees in English and Creative Writing from the University of Cincinnati and Johns Hopkins University. He is the author of three collections of poetry and the editor of Howard Nemerov's Selected Poems. He has held teaching positions at Murray State University, the University of the South, Kenyon College, the University of North Carolina, and the University of Alabama at Birmingham. Currently, he is Associate Professor at the University of Oregon, where he teaches in the graduate Creative Writing program. Anderson frequently serves as a faculty member at the Sewanee Writers' Conference.

Awards
 National Endowment for the Arts Fellowship
 Nicholas Roerich Poetry Prize
 New Jersey State Council on the Arts Fellowship
 Pushcart Prize
 Bogliasco Fellowship

Bibliography

Poetry collections

Edited Collection

References

Living people
Poets from Ohio
University of Oregon faculty
1964 births
University of Cincinnati alumni
Johns Hopkins University alumni
Murray State University faculty
Kenyon College faculty
University of North Carolina at Chapel Hill faculty
University of Alabama at Birmingham faculty
Sewanee: The University of the South faculty
Writers from Ohio
21st-century American poets